The 2012 Cleveland Browns season was the franchise's 64th season as a professional sports franchise and its 60th season as a member of the National Football League. Although the team improved on its record to 5–11 this 2012 season from its 4–12 finish in 2011, the team still placed fourth in the AFC North. The team also failed to break its 9-year playoff drought, the longest in franchise history.  The 2012 season was the third season under the leadership of team president Mike Holmgren and general manager Tom Heckert and the second season under head coach Pat Shurmur. The Browns also had Jimmy Haslam as their new owner, after buying the team from Randy Lerner. The Browns played all of their home games at Cleveland Browns Stadium in Cleveland, Ohio.

Off-season

Ownership change 
On August 2, team owner Randy Lerner sold the controlling interest of the Browns to Tennessee businessman Jimmy Haslam.  Haslam is the owner of Pilot Flying J travel centers and was previously a minority owner of the Pittsburgh Steelers.  The amount of the sale was in excess of US$1 billion.

The sale was approved on October 25, 2012.

Coaching changes 

On January 11, defensive backs coach Jerome Henderson left the Browns to take the same position with the Dallas Cowboys.

On January 18, the Browns hired Nolan Cromwell as a senior offensive assistant.  Cromwell replaces Keith Gilbertson, who retired following the 2011 season.

On January 23, the Browns hired former Tennessee Titans' assistant secondary coach Tim Hauck to replace Henderson as defensive backs coach.  Hauck was on the Titans' staff from 2009 to 2010, and served as an assistant at the collegiate level prior to that.

On January 27, the Browns hired former Minnesota Vikings' head coach Brad Childress as offensive coordinator.  Childress coached the Vikings from 2006 to 2010. From 2003 to 2005, he was the offensive coordinator of the Philadelphia Eagles, where he worked with current Browns' head coach Pat Shurmur.

Roster changes

Free agency

Releases

Signings

2012 Draft Class 

The draft occurred from April 26–28.  The Browns had an NFL-high eleven selections.

NOTES:
 On Draft Day, The Browns acquired the Minnesota Vikings' first-round pick (No. 3) for their own first- (No. 4), fourth- (No. 118), fifth- (No. 139) and seventh- (No. 211) round selections.
 The Browns acquired the Atlanta Falcons' 2012 first-  (No. 22) and fourth- (No. 118, traded to Minnesota) round selections and 2011 first-, second-, and fourth-round selections for Cleveland's 2011 first-round selection.
 The Browns traded their third-round pick (No. 67) to the Denver Broncos for their third- (No. 87) and fourth- (No. 120) round picks.
 The Browns acquired the Denver Broncos' fifth-round selection, as well as a 2011 sixth-round selection and RB Peyton Hillis in exchange for QB Brady Quinn during the 2010 offseason.
 Although the Browns have two sixth-round selections, they traded their original selection in this round to the Minnesota Vikings for DE Jayme Mitchell.
 Compensatory selection

Undrafted Free Agents

Supplemental Draft 
On July 12, the Browns selected WR Josh Gordon of Baylor with a second round pick in the supplemental draft.  The Browns will forfeit their second round pick in the 2013 NFL Draft.  Gordon became only the second player drafted by the Browns in the supplemental draft, the other being QB Bernie Kosar in 1985.

Other news and notes

LB Fujita suspension 
On May 2, NFL commissioner Roger Goodell announced a three-game suspension for LB Scott Fujita for his role in the New Orleans Saints bounty scandal in 2009.  Fujita was suspended along with former Saints teammates Jonathan Vilma, Anthony Hargrove, and Will Smith for what the commissioner called "conduct detrimental to the NFL as a result of their leadership roles."

Fujita and the three other players have appealed the suspensions, however on July 3 Goodell upheld the suspensions.

On September 7, two days before the Week 1 game, the suspensions against Fujita and the other players were overturned.  Fujita started the Week 1 contest.

DT Taylor injury 
On May 10, starting DT Phil Taylor tore his left pectoral muscle while doing bench presses in the weight room.  Taylor, the Browns' 1st round draft choice in 2011, will be out for several months and may miss the entire season.

Suicide of grounds crew member 
A member of the Browns' grounds crew killed himself at their practice facility in Berea, Ohio, a team spokesman said Sunday, December 2, 2012. The man's body was found Saturday morning, December 1, 2012, at the facility in suburban Cleveland, the same day Kansas City Chiefs linebacker Jovan Belcher committed suicide after killing his girlfriend. Browns spokesman Neal Gulkis confirmed to The Associated Press that a team employee died of a suicide, but provided no other details. He released a statement calling the man a good friend and an outstanding employee and saying the team's heartfelt condolences go out to his family.

Staff

Rosters

Opening training camp roster

Week 1 Roster

Final roster

Preseason

Schedule

LB Gocong injury 
On August 4, starting LB Chris Gocong tore his right Achilles tendon during morning practice. He will likely miss the entire season.

QB Weeden named starter 
On August 6, coach Pat Shurmur named Brandon Weeden as the starting QB. Weeden, 28, was picked 22nd overall by the Browns in the 2012 NFL Draft.

First roster cuts 
All NFL teams were required to cut their rosters from 90 players to 75 by August 27.  One day earlier, the Browns released nine players, most  notably WR veteran WR Carlton Mitchell.

The Browns also placed LBs Emanuel Acho and Chris Gocong on injured reserve, waived/injured DEs Marcus Benard and Auston English and CB Antwaun Reed.  The team also placed DT Phil Taylor on the physically unable to perform list.

With one open roster spot, the Browns claimed DE Ernest Owusu off waivers from the Minnesota Vikings.

Second roster cuts 
All NFL teams were required to cut their rosters from 75 players to 53 by August 31.  The Browns cut quarterback Seneca Wallace; running back Adonis Thomas; fullback Brad Smelley; wide receivers Josh Cooper and Rod Windsor, tight ends Dan Gronkowski and Evan Moore; offensive linemen Dominic Alford, Stanley Daniels, Garth Gerhart, Jerrod Shaw, and J.B. Shugarts; defensive linemen Ronnie Cameron, William Green, Ernest Owushu, Brian Schaefering, and Kiante Tripp; linebackers Benjamin Jacobs and Quinton Spears; and defensive back James Dockery.  In addition, DT Phil Taylor remained on the physically unable to perform list.

Cameron, Cooper, Gerhart, Jacobs, Shaw, Shugarts, and Smelley were added to the Browns' practice squad.

Captains elected 
On September 2, the Browns elected offensive tackle Joe Thomas, linebacker D'Qwell Jackson, and kicker Phil Dawson as captains.

Regular season

Schedule

Note: Intra-divisional opponents are in bold text.

Game summaries

Week 1: vs. Philadelphia Eagles

The Browns opened their season against the Philadelphia Eagles. They got their first points of the 2012 season when Phil Dawson kicked a 43-yard field goal to make the score 3–0 for the only points of the opening quarter. The Eagles responded to tie the game at 3–3 when Alex Henery kicked a 42-yard field goal followed by Michael Vick finding Jeremy Maclin in the end zone on an 18-yard touchdown pass to make the halftime score 10–3. Heading into the third quarter and extending into the 4th, the Browns scored 13 unanswered points starting with Dawson's field goals from 42 (for the only score of the quarter) and 22 yards out shortening the Eagles' lead from four to just a point from 10–6 to 10–9. And then, the Browns retook the lead when D'Qwell Jackson ran for a 13-yard touchdown for a 16–10 game. However, the Eagles were able to complete the comeback as Vick found Clay Harbor on a 4-yard pass making the final score 17–16.

The Browns started their season 0–1 for the eighth straight year.

Week 2: at Cincinnati Bengals

After a tough home loss to the Eagles, the Browns traveled on the road to take on the Bengals for Round 1 of the Battle Of Ohio. With less than 90 seconds played, the Bengals scored as Pacman Jones returned a punt 81 yards for a touchdown making the score 7–0. The Browns responded with Phil Dawson's 50-yard field goal to come within 4 at 7–3. In the 2nd quarter Andy Dalton found A.J. Green on a 10-yard touchdown pass making the score 14–3 for an 11-point lead. The Browns followed up with Trent Richardson running for a 32-yard touchdown making the score 14–10 but the Bengals pulled away as Mike Nugent nailed a 39-yard field goal for a 17–10 halftime lead. In the 3rd quarter, the Bengals went right back to work when Dalton found Brandon Tate on a 44-yard touchdown pass to increase their lead to 24–10. Again, the Browns tried to rally by coming in just a touchdown short with Brandon Weeden's first NFL career touchdown pass, a 23-yard pass to Richardson to make the score 24–17. The Bengals pulled away in the 4th quarter as Dalton found Andrew Hawkins on a 50-yard pass making the score 31–17 but again, the Browns tried to rally by coming within a touchdown as Weeden found Greg Little on a 24-yard pass making the score 31–24. After this, the Bengals moved ahead by double digits for the first time since leading by 14 in the 3rd quarter with Nugent's 37-yard field goal for a 34–24 lead. The Browns tried to rally a comeback but could only come away with 3 points as Dawson nailed a 25-yard field goal for a final score of 34–27.

With the loss, the Browns fell to 0–2. Also, with the Steelers' victory over the Jets, the team now sits in sole possession of last place in the AFC North as well as losing by a certain number of points increasing as the weeks go by from losing to the Eagles by a point in Week 1 to losing to the Bengals by 7 points in Week 2.

Week 3: vs. Buffalo Bills

The Browns returned home for a home game against the Bills. Again, the Browns fell behind and for the second straight week never held the lead as Bills QB Ryan Fitzpatrick found T. J. Graham on a 9-yard touchdown pass for a 7–0 lead followed up by Fitzpatrick finding C. J. Spiller on a 32-yard touchdown pass for a 14–0 lead. The Browns got on the board in the 2nd quarter when Trent Richardson ran for a 6-yard touchdown to make the score 14–7 at halftime. However, the Bills went back to work in the 3rd quarter as Rian Lindell nailed a 37-yard field goal to take a 10-point lead of 17–7. The Browns tried to rally coming within 3 points of the Bills when Brandon Weeden found Travis Benjamin on a 22-yard pass at 17–14. However, the Bills pulled away and wrapped this game up as Fitzpatrick found Stevie Johnson on a 9-yard touchdown pass for a final score of 24–14.

With the loss, the Browns fell to 0–3 with their loss by a certain number of points worsened to 10.

Week 4: at Baltimore Ravens

The Browns traveled to Baltimore to take on the Ravens on Thursday Night Football. After a scoreless first quarter, the Ravens scored first in the second quarter as Joe Flacco found Torrey Smith on an 18-yard touchdown pass (with a failed PAT) for a 6–0 lead. The team increased their lead as Justin Tucker made a 45-yard field goal to make the score 9–0. Finally, the Browns scored not long before halftime when Trent Richardson ran for a 2-yard touchdown, making the halftime score 9–7. After the break, the Ravens went right back to work as Flacco threw several completions to Anquan Boldin before scoring on a 1-yard touchdown run for a 16–7 lead. However, The Browns drew within 6 points as Phil Dawson nailed a 51-yard field goal, making the score 16–10. But then, the Ravens pulled away as Cary Williams picked off Weeden and returned the ball 63 yards for a touchdown, making the score 23–10. In the fourth quarter, the Browns tried to come back as Dawson nailed two field goals from 50 and 52 yards out making the score 23–13 and then 23–16, respectively. However, the Ravens took control of the game and the Browns' record dropped to 0–4 on the season, losing their 13th straight game against a division rival and their 9th straight game against the Ravens.

Week 5: at New York Giants

After a tough road loss to the Ravens, the Browns went to face against the Giants on the road. They drew first blood taking a 7–0 lead as Trent Richardson ran for a 15-yard touchdown followed by Brandon Weeden finding Josh Gordon on a 62-yard touchdown pass leaving the Browns with a 14–0 lead. Finally, the Giants were able to get on the board when Eli Manning found Victor Cruz on a 3-yard pass to shorten the lead 14–7. In the 2nd quarter, the Browns moved ahead by double digits again as Phil Dawson kicked a 32-yard field goal for a 17–7. The Giants then again responded by scoring 17 unanswered points before halftime starting by coming within a touchdown off of Lawrence Tynes' 29-yard field goal making the score 17–10. Then the Giants were able to tie it as Ahmad Bradshaw ran for a 4-yard touchdown for a 17–17 score before the Giants took the lead as Manning found Cruz again on a 7-yard pass making the score 24–17. Tynes made the score 27–17 with a 40-yard field goal not long before halftime. The Giants went right back to work in the third quarter as Manning found Cruz a 3rd time on a 28-yard pass increasing their lead to 34–17. Then the Browns tried to rally a comeback but only came away with Dawson nailing a 41-yard field goal making the score 34–20. Then in the fourth quarter, David Wilson ran for a 40-yard touchdown making the score 41–20. The Browns wrapped up the game scoring with Weeden finding Gordon again on a 20-yard pass for a final score of 41–27.

The Browns dropped to 0–5 on the season. And with the Saints' win over the Chargers on Sunday Night, they remain the league's only winless team.

Week 6: vs. Cincinnati Bengals

The Browns returned home for Round 2 of 2012's Battle of Ohio. The Bengals got off to a fast start in the first quarter as Andy Dalton found Jermaine Gresham on a 55-yard touchdown pass making the score 7–0 for the only score of the period. The Browns then managed to tie it as Brandon Weeden found Josh Gordon on a 71-yard touchdown pass for a 7–7 game before the Bengals moved back into the lead with Dalton's 4-yard pass to A. J. Green making the score 14–7 at halftime. The Browns went into a frenzy of points in the 2nd half starting scoring 13 unanswered points starting in the 3rd quarter when Phil Dawson nailed two field goals from 41 and 38 yards out making the score 14–10 and then 14–13 respectively. And in the fourth quarter, they took the lead as Montario Hardestly ran for a 1-yard touchdown for a 20–14 lead. The Bengals came within three points as Mike Nugent kicked a 44-yard field goal making the score 20–17. But the Browns increased their lead with two straight touchdowns as Weeden found Benjamin Watson on a 4-yard pass followed by Sheldon Brown who returned an interception 17 yards for a touchdown making the score 27–17 and then 34–17. The Bengals tried to rally a comeback as Dalton found Green again on a 57-yard pass. But the Bengals failed to rally and therefore lost this game by a final score of 34–24 as the Browns managed to snap their four-game losing streak to the Bengals as well as their 13-game losing streak to division rivals as they improved to 1–5 with the win.

Week 7: at Indianapolis Colts

The Browns traveled to Indianapolis to take on an Andrew Luck-led Colts offense. The Colts were able to score in the first quarter as Andrew Luck ran for a 3-yard touchdown making the score 7–0 for the only score of the game. The Browns responded in the 2nd quarter coming within a point when Brandon Weeden found Greg Little on a 14-yard pass (with a failed PAT) making the score 7–6. Then, Luck ran for another touchdown this time from 5 yards out to make the score 14–6 at halftime. The Browns came within a point again in the 3rd quarter as Weeden found Josh Gordon on a 33-yard pass making the score 14–13 but the Colts wrapped things up with Adam Vinatieri's 38-yard field goal followed by a scoreless 4th quarter making the final score 17–13 as the Browns' road record at this point of the season was 0–4 while their record overall was 1–6.

Week 8: vs. San Diego Chargers

In rainy and windy conditions, Trent Richardson scored the game's only touchdown, running from 26 yards out for a 7–0 lead. The Chargers managed to get on the board as Nick Novak score a 43-yard field goal before halftime making the score 7–3. The Chargers then scored the only points of the second half in the third quarter, with Novak scoring a 31-yard field goal making the score 7–6. There were no further scores and the Browns increased their record to 2–6 and their home record to 2–2.

Week 9: vs. Baltimore Ravens

The Ravens took a 14–0 lead after the first quarter, but the Browns took the lead with five consecutive field goals from Phil Dawson. However, the Ravens retook the lead for good in the fourth quarter. With their 10th-straight loss to the Ravens, the Browns went into their bye week at 2–7.

Week 11: at Dallas Cowboys

The Browns came into Cowboys Stadium leading 13–0 at halftime. However, the lead was blown as the Browns were outscored 20–7 in the 2nd half with the Cowboys kicking a late field goal to tie the game at 20–20 and send it into overtime. There, the Cowboys kicked the game-winning field goal, dropping the Browns to 2–8 and 0–3 against the NFC East.

Week 12: vs. Pittsburgh Steelers

Although the Steelers scored first on a 53-yard interception return by Lawrence Timmons, the Browns benefited from eight Pittsburgh turnovers and the Browns defeated the Steelers 20–14. This was the first Browns victory over the Steelers since Week 14 of the 2009 season, and only the fifth time the Browns beat the Steelers since returning to the NFL in 1999. The Browns became the only AFC North team on the season to successfully defend their home territory against the Steelers. After the game, it was announced that team president Mike Holmgren would leave the Browns with immediate effect.

Week 13: at Oakland Raiders

Behind Brandon Weeden's career high passing day (364 yards), the Browns defeated the Oakland Raiders 20–17, snapping a 12-game road losing streak, and their first consecutive wins since Weeks 2 and 3 of the 2011 season.

Week 14: vs. Kansas City Chiefs

Helped by a 93-yard punt return by Travis Benjamin (the longest punt return for a touchdown in franchise history), the Browns defeated the Kansas City Chiefs 30–7 for their first three-game win streak since 2009, improving their current season to 5–8 and 3–0 against the AFC West. With losses by the Bengals and Steelers (both 7–6), the Browns still remain in playoff contention moving up to only two games behind their two longest rivals.
This remained the Browns' only December victory until a 24–10 win over the San Francisco 49ers in 2015.

Week 15: vs. Washington Redskins

With the loss, the Browns fell to 5–9 and were eliminated from the postseason contention. This loss clinched the team's fifth straight losing season and 12th in the 14 years since rejoining the NFL. The Browns were 4–4 in home games.

Week 16: at Denver Broncos

With the loss, the Browns dropped to 5–10 on the season, and as a result they officially clinched fourth place in the AFC North for the second straight season since they still remained two games behind the third-placed Steelers (7–8), who got booted from the playoff race by the Bengals earlier that day.

Next week the Browns look to win in Pittsburgh for the first time since 2003, and sweep the Steelers for the first time since 1988.

Week 17: at Pittsburgh Steelers

After a tough loss at the Broncos, the Browns traveled to Pittsburgh for game 2 of the 2012 series. The Browns were able to tie the game at 3–3 and then 10–10. However, they were overpowered by the Steelers as they scored 14 unanswered points to make the final score 24–10. The Browns went on to lose the game, finishing 5–11 for the season. They finished 1–7 in games away from home.

The day after the game, the Browns fired head coach Pat Shurmur and general manager Tom Heckert. In two seasons as Browns head coach, Shurmur posted a record of 9–23, including a disappointing 2–10 mark within the division (1–3 vs. the Bengals and Steelers and 0–4 vs. the Ravens).

Standings

2013 Pro Bowl 

On December 26, T Joe Thomas and K Phil Dawson were recognized for their individual accomplishments by being named to the AFC Pro Bowl roster.  Thomas, who will be the starting left tackle, is making his sixth consecutive appearance in the Pro Bowl, while this is the first Pro Bowl appearance for Dawson in his 14-year career.

KR Joshua Cribbs, LB D'Qwell Jackson, and C Alex Mack were named first alternates at their respective positions.

References

External links
  
 2012 Cleveland Browns at Pro Football Reference (Profootballreference.com)
 2012 Cleveland Browns Statistics at jt-sw.com
 2012 Cleveland Browns Schedule at jt-sw.com
 2012 Cleveland Browns at DatabaseFootball.com  

Cleveland
Cleveland Browns seasons
Cleveland